Long Lake is a  lake located on Vancouver Island, Canada, northeast of Ladysmith Harbour.

See also
List of lakes of British Columbia

References

Lakes of Vancouver Island
Mid Vancouver Island
Lakes of British Columbia
Oyster Land District